In graph theory, a Hall violator is a set of vertices in a graph, that violate the condition to Hall's marriage theorem.

Therefore, there is also no matching that saturates . Hall's marriage theorem says that the opposite is also true: if there is no Hall violator, then there exists a matching that saturates .

Algorithms

Finding a Hall violator 
A Hall violator can be found by an efficient algorithm. The algorithm below uses the following terms:

As an example, consider the figure at the right, where the vertical (blue) edges denote the matching .

The algorithm for finding a Hall violator proceeds as follows.

 Find a maximum matching  (it can be found with the Hopcroft–Karp algorithm). 
 Otherwise, let  be an unmatched vertex. 
 Return .

This  is indeed a Hall-violator because of the following facts:

 Hence, so  indeed satisfies the definition of a Hall violator.

Finding minimal and minimum Hall violators 
An inclusion-minimal Hall violator is a Hall violator such that each of its subsets is not a Hall violator.

The above algorithm, in fact, finds an inclusion-minimal Hall violator.

The above algorithm does not necessarily find a minimum-cardinality Hall violator. For example, in the above figure, it returns a Hall violator of size 5, while  is a Hall violator of size 3.

In fact, finding a minimum-cardinality Hall violator is NP-hard. This can be proved by reduction from the Clique problem.

Finding a Hall violator or an augmenting path 

It returns as output, either a Hall violator that contains , or a path that can be used to augment .

 Set , }, .
 Assert:
 If , then  is a Hall violator, since . Return the Hall-violator .
 Otherwise, let  be a vertex in  Consider the following two cases:
 Go back to step 2.
Hence we have an M-augmenting path. Return the M-augmenting path.

At each iteration,  and   grow by one vertex. Hence, the algorithm must finish after at most  iterations.

This provides a constructive proof to Hall's theorem.

External links 

 An application of Hall violators in constraint programming.

References 

Graph theory